Joe Grue is an American bridge player.

Bridge accomplishments

Wins
 Bermuda Bowl (1) 2017
 North American Bridge Championships (7)
 North American Pairs (1) 2011 
 Keohane North American Swiss Teams (1) 2008 
 Reisinger (1) 2006 
 Vanderbilt (3) 2012, 2018, 2023
 Spingold (1) 2016
 Buffett Cup (1) 2012

Runners-up

 Bermuda Bowl (1) 2011 
 North American Bridge Championships (3)
 Grand National Teams (1) 2009 
 Spingold (1) 2013 
 Vanderbilt (1) 2011

Notes

External links
 

American contract bridge players